Joseph Theodore Deters (born April 4, 1957) is an American politician and lawyer who currently serves as an Associate Justice of the Ohio Supreme Court.

Early life, family, and education 
Deters is a lifelong Cincinnatian.  He is one of eight children born to Nancy and Donald Deters.  His grandfather, Daniel Tehan, was a longtime Hamilton County Sheriff.

Deters graduated from St. Xavier High School in 1975.  He graduated with a Bachelor's degree from the University of Cincinnati in 1979, and his Juris Doctor from the University of Cincinnati College of Law in 1982.

Career
Deters began his career in public service in 1982 as an Assistant Hamilton County Prosecutor. In 1988, after six years as an Assistant Prosecutor, Deters was elected the Hamilton County Clerk of Courts. In 1992, Deters returned to the Hamilton County Prosecutor's office when he was appointed and later elected Prosecuting Attorney. He was subsequently reelected in 1996.

In 1999, Deters was sworn in as Ohio's 44th State Treasurer. Deters resigned from office in 2004 amid a pay-to-play scandal that saw Deters's former chief of staff, Matt Borges plead guilty to improper use of a public office. Borges traded campaign contributions for preferential treatment in receiving state contracts. Deters was never implicated or charged in the scheme.

In the fall of 2004, Deters became a write-in candidate for his former position, Hamilton County Prosecuting Attorney. He was elected Hamilton County Prosecuting Attorney on November 2, 2004, with nearly 60% of the vote. He was subsequently reelected in 2008, 2012, 2016, and 2020. Deters resigned as Hamilton County Prosecuting Attorney after being appointed to the Supreme Court of Ohio in 2023. On April 1, 2005, Deters and Matthias Heck were sued iny  their official capacity in a federal lawsuit, Citizens for Tax Reform v. Deters.

As Prosecutor, Deters has managed high-profile cases that have attracted national and international attention. In 1987, he led the investigation of Donald Harvey, a convicted serial killer who pleaded guilty to murdering 37 people as apla hospital orderly.  Approximately 30 years later, he prosecuted his fifth serial killer, Samuel Little, who murdered two Cincinnati women over the course of a 30-year killing spree.  In total, Deters has prosecuted six serial killers.

In 2012, Deters was highly critical of Xavier University for expelling Dezmine Wells, one of its basketball players, due to a rape allegation. Prior to the school hearing on the matter, a grand jury had refused to prosecute Wells, and Deters—who is known for being tough on crime and said the prosecutor's office had conducted a thorough investigation—maintained that the accusation lacked any credibility and the decision "wasn't even close." He said that the school proceedings had egregiously violated Wells' right to a fair hearing by putting the burden of proof on Wells instead of his accuser, had assigned incompetent staff to examine the forensic evidence, and prevented Wells from presenting evidence which would have proven his innocence. After learning of Xavier's decision, he called for the university to reexamine Wells' expulsion.

On July 29, 2015, Deters oversaw the indictment of University of Cincinnati police officer Ray Tensing in the killing of Sam DuBose during a traffic stop. He called the killing "totally unwarranted" and "senseless." His comments regarding the killing received some criticism from the public. Many critics also pointed to the published comments of the editorial board of the Cincinnati Enquirer which had previously criticized Deters for his remarks about a violent assault earlier that month which he had decided not to charge as a racially motivated crime. In describing the people responsible for the assault, Deters called such people "soulless and unsalvageable" and implied that he perceived a race or broadly generalized socioeconomic status origin to this type of violence when he said further:

Nevertheless, the office worked quickly to complete the investigation, filing charges just 10 days after the initial shooting. However, a divided jury failed to reach a verdict on two separate occasions, prompting Deters’ announcement that the County would not try the case a third time.

Following a violent 2021 Fourth of July weekend in Cincinnati, which included a shooting at a downtown park, Deters announced that the office would no longer offer plea bargains in any cases involving gun violence or possession of illegal firearms. He added, “People must be held accountable for their choices. As a community, we must stand together and say ‘enough is enough.’”

Political positions
Throughout his tenure, Deters has gained a reputation for being a “tough on crime” prosecutor, believing in strict punishments for violent crime, including the death penalty. He has maintained this stance, even after a Vatican official rebuked Deters, a Roman Catholic, for pursuing the death penalty for serial killer Anthony Kirkland, who killed two adult women and two young girls between 2006 and 2009. Responding to the official, Deters said:

He has repeated that he was elected to uphold Ohio law, which includes the death penalty. To critics, he states, “If the citizens of Ohio want the law changed, they should contact their state representative and let him or her know. I have no quarrel with that.”

In July 2018, Deters said he wants the state to bring back death penalty by firing squad amid complaints about lethal injection.

However, since assuming office, Deters has also supported diversion programs, aiming to help “low-level, nonviolent offenders avoid jail time, find rehabilitation, and get their lives back on track.”  In 2010, he helped establish the Hamilton County Drug Court – the first in the state of Ohio. Other programs his office have sponsored include Mental Health Court, Juvenile Diversion Program, and CHANGE Court, a specialized court serving those charged with prostitution and related offenses.

Affiliations
Deters is a member of the Cincinnati Bar Association, National District Attorneys Association, and Ohio Prosecuting Attorneys Association. He has served on the University of Cincinnati Board of Trustees, Ohio Organized Crime Commission, and the Southern Ohio Leukemia Foundation.

Personal life
He has four children and one grandchild. He is currently married since (October 2021) to Tanya O'Rourke (WCPO-9).

Electoral history

1988 - Clerk of Courts Election 
In 1988, Deters was appointed Hamilton County Clerk of Courts and sought election to the office that year. He campaigned on the platform to revitalize and modernize the office, which he had previously described as operating in “the dark ages.”  Upon winning election, he first adopted a zero tolerance policy concerning theft in the office, aggressively pursuing employees who embezzled funds. Furthermore, he ceased the practice of political payroll deductions, which, at the time, had been prevalent within many county offices across Ohio. As Clerk, he administered a yearly budget of more than 10 million dollars.

1992 - Hamilton County Prosecuting Attorney Election 
Likewise, in 1992, Deters was appointed Hamilton County Prosecutor and sought election to the office later that year. As a candidate, he led the ticket for administrative offices, promising to implement policies and innovations that would elevate the office to a higher level, including a Victims Assistance Program, an Environmental Prosecution Unit, and a County Public Corruption Unit. He defeated Democrat Robert Gutwiller, winning 64.1 percent of the vote.

1996 - Hamilton County Prosecuting Attorney Election 
In 1996, Deters ran for re-election unopposed, capturing over 250 thousand votes.

1998 - Ohio State Treasurer Election 
With endorsements from the Ohio Fraternal Order of Police and Ohio Certified Public Accountants, Deters sought to capture the position of State Treasurer, promising to ensure the safety of public monies and diversify the state’s debt portfolio. He defeated Democrat John Donofrio, earning 70 percent of the vote.

2002 - Ohio State Treasurer Election 
In 2002, Deters battled Democrat Mary O. Boyle, a former State Legislator, for re-election to the Treasurer seat. If re-elected, Deters sought to continue the process of digitizing the office, receiving and distributing money electronically. A close race, Deters won the reelection after capturing roughly 53 percent of the vote.

2004 - Hamilton County Prosecuting Attorney Election 
Deters entered the 2004 Prosecutor race after then-Hamilton County Prosecutor Michael Allen withdrew amid allegations of sexual harassment. Given that this was also a Presidential Election year, Deters felt it was crucial to enter so that Republicans could retain viability and legitimacy within the region.  A write-in candidate, he faced Democrat Fanon Rucker, who previously served as an Assistant Prosecutor for the City of Cincinnati. Deters eventually won with 57 percent of the vote.

2008 - Hamilton County Prosecuting Attorney Election 
In 2008, Deters ran for re-election unopposed, again capturing over 250 thousand votes.

2012 - Hamilton County Prosecuting Attorney Election 
Facing Former City of Cincinnati Prosecuting Attorney Janaya Trotter, Deters campaigned on the promise to continue removing violent offenders from the streets and ensuring the safety of Hamilton County residents. Deters later defeated Trotter, garnering 59 percent of the vote.

2016 - Hamilton County Prosecuting Attorney Election 
In his bid for a sixth term, Deters faced Alan Triggs, a former assistant prosecutor and Magistrate Judge.  Deters campaigned on a similar platform, aggressively prosecuting violent criminals while seeking opportunities for diversion programs, where appropriate. He won by among the narrowest margins of his career in this race, winning roughly 54 percent of the vote.

2020 - Hamilton County Prosecuting Attorney Election 
A re-match of the 2004 write-in campaign, Deters faced and eventually defeated Fanon Rucker in the 2020 Election. Calling it the “most satisfying” victory of his political career, Deters won after his campaign targeted voters who had become dissatisfied with then-Republican President Donald Trump, overcoming the president’s 65 thousand-vote deficit in Hamilton County.

References

External links
Hamilton County Prosecutor Biography
Campaign Data via Our Campaigns

|-

|-

1957 births
County district attorneys in Ohio
Justices of the Ohio Supreme Court
Living people
Ohio lawyers
Ohio Republicans
Ohio state court judges
Politicians from Cincinnati
St. Xavier High School (Ohio) alumni
State treasurers of Ohio
University of Cincinnati College of Law alumni